Anthony McElligott (born 1955) is an emeritus professor of history at the University of Limerick.

Works

References

1955 births
Living people
Academics of the University of Limerick
Historians of Germany